Jakarta XML RPC (JAX-RPC; formerly Java API for XML Based RPC) allows a Jakarta EE application to invoke a Java-based web service with a known description while still being consistent with its WSDL description. JAX-RPC is one of the Java XML programming APIs. It can be seen as Java RMIs over web services. JAX-RPC 2.0 was renamed JAX-WS 2.0 (Java API for XML Web Services). JAX-RPC 1 is deprecated with Java EE 6. The JAX-RPC service utilizes W3C (World Wide Web Consortium) standards like WSDL or Web Service Description Language.
The core API classes are located in the Java package .
 Supports web-based services and clients using RPC or remote procedure calls which are based on XML.
 Allow for web service accessibility through Java APIs which in turn allows for communication between different Java applications.
 Enables client communication with web service of different language and running on separate platform.

It works as follows:
A Java program executes a method on a stub (local object representing the remote service)
The stub executes routines in the JAX-RPC Runtime System (RS)
The RS converts the remote method invocation into a SOAP message
The RS transmits the message as an HTTP request

The advantage of such a method is that it allows the Web service to be implemented at server-side as a Servlet or EJB container. Thus, Servlet or EJB applications are made available through Web services.

Jakarta XML RPC (JAX-RPC) was removed from Jakarta EE 9.

References

External links

JAX-RPC 2.0 renamed to JAX-WS 2.0

Java API for XML
Web service specifications
Java enterprise platform